"Vicious Circle" is a Return of the Saint episode of the television series. It was broadcast on February 11, 1979. In the episode, Simon Templar's friend is murdered while driving.  The episode is cast in Italy.  The American actor Mel Ferrer played the role of psychiatrist Dr. Paoli Bruli, who spoke English with an American accent.

Plot
Simon Templar's friend, Roberto Lucci, has a car phone (uncommon for the era). Lucci telephones Templar saying that he will meet him in a few minutes but then complains there is a slow moving truck ahead of him and proceeds to dangerously pass the truck. Templar warns his race car driver friend that he's not on a race track. Soon afterwards, the race car driver is killed in a road traffic collision. Templar does not believe it is an accident because his friend is too good a driver.

Templar starts to investigate when he gets an anonymous call. "We know who you are. We know who your looking for. Don't look any more, Sr. Templar, unless you want us to do to you what we did to Roberto Lucci".

Templar then suspects that Roberto's ex-wife is the killer. She replies "...but I'm a lousy truck driver. Of course, I could have paid someone to do it." Templar says that he admires her honesty but is rebuked.

Templar then follows Mrs. Roberto Lucci's fiance, a psychiatrist. He confronts the psychiatrist. The psychiatrist then goes home and said "He thinks I killed your husband. If he starts that kind of talk, my practice will shrink to zero in zero seconds." Mrs. Lucci replies, "What a terrible nightmare" to whom the psychiatrist suggest going away and eloping. They have sex, which infuriates the maid, who sees some of it.

Templar later finds that the housekeeper, whom he finds out is a secret lesbian, is jealous at Mrs. Lucci and her wedding plans. She hired the killer. She is taken away by the police.

References

1979 British television episodes